ON was a solo project of Ken Andrews, which he started after the breakup of his previous band, Failure.  The music of ON was not unlike that of Failure in terms of songwriting, but the overall sound was more based on electronics, with less emphasis on guitars and the typical heavy rock sound.

ON was signed to Epic Records in 1999, and the first single, "Soluble Words", was released late that year.  It contains four versions of the song, including a remix by Martin Gore of Depeche Mode, and an exclusive track called "Your Sister Says John" (written by Andrews' friend Jordon Zadorozny of Blinker the Star).

After several months, ON's album Shifting Skin was released in June 2000.  Ken then assembled a backing band, which consisted of drummer Tim Dow (ex-Shiner/Season to Risk), bassist Tommy Walter (Abandoned Pools), guitarist Joey Sykes, and keyboardist Kevin Moore, and took ON on tour.  Another single, "Slingshot", was serviced to radio, bubbling just under the Alternative Top 50; but the album didn't sell well, and Epic eventually released Andrews from his contract.

A second ON album, Make Believe, was released in 2002 via CD Baby and the iTunes Store.  Also in 2002, he (and Dow) formed a new group called Year of the Rabbit.  Currently, Andrews is working as a solo artist, a member of Failure and a member of Digital Noise Academy, as well as being a sought-after producer and session musician.

External links

Ken Andrews - official site

American electronic music groups